Vladimír Maňka (born 19 September 1959 in Lučenec) is a Slovak politician and Member of the European Parliament (2004–2019) with the Direction, part of the Socialist Group.

In parliament, Maňka sits on the European Parliament's Committee on Budgets. He is a substitute for the Committee on Economic and Monetary Affairs, substitute for the Delegation for relations with the countries of Southeast Asia and the Association of Southeast Asian Nations (ASEAN).

In January 2017, Maňka was elected as quaestor of the European Parliament for two and a half years. His role as quaestor made him part of the Parliament’s leadership under President Antonio Tajani.

Career
 1978–1983: Slovak University of Technology (Bratislava), Faculty of Civil Engineering
 1995–1998: City University (Bratislava)
 1983–1992: Detva heavy engineering works
 1992–1998: Manager of a commercial company
 1995–1998: Chairman of the economic council of SDĽ (Party of the Democratic Left)
 1996–1998: Head of the economy section
 since 2003: Deputy Chairman of SDĽ
 1997–1998: Member of the finance committee
 since 1999: Lord Mayor of Zvolen
 2002–2004: Chairman of the board of the Banská Bystrica regional development agency

Education
 Member of the National Council of the Slovak Republic
 Vice-Chairman of the Committee for Finance, the Budget and Currency
 Member of the Committee for European Integration
 1998–2002: Member of the EU-Slovak Republic Joint Parliamentary Committee
 1998–2002: Vice-Chairman of the academic senate of City University (Bratislava)
 since 2003: Chairman of the board of directors of Zvolen Technical University
 2002: Holder of the 'Cena mesta Banská Bystrica' (City of Banská Bystrica Award)

See also
 2004 European Parliament election in Slovakia

References

External links
 
 
 

1959 births
Living people
Governors of Banská Bystrica Region
Direction – Social Democracy MEPs
MEPs for Slovakia 2004–2009
MEPs for Slovakia 2009–2014
MEPs for Slovakia 2014–2019
People from Lučenec
Members of the National Council (Slovakia) 1998-2002